The 1911 Milan–San Remo was the fifth edition of the Milan–San Remo cycle race and was held on 2 April 1911. The race started in Milan and finished in San Remo. The race was won by Gustave Garrigou.

General classification

References

1911
1911 in road cycling
1911 in Italian sport
April 1911 sports events